All in the Bunker is a 2009 animated short film written, directed, and animated by Andrew Overtoom. It is a Go Mental Productions film and stars Kurtwood Smith and Cheryl Hines.

Cast
 Kurtwood Smith as Adolf Hitler
 Cheryl Hines as Eva Braun
 Don Novello as Pope Pius XII
 Marco Cinello as Benito Mussolini
 S. Scott Bullock as the narrator

External links
 

2009 films
2000s animated short films
American animated short films
American satirical films
Films about Nazi Germany
Cultural depictions of Adolf Hitler
Cultural depictions of Benito Mussolini
Cultural depictions of Eva Braun
Cultural depictions of Pope Pius XII
2009 short films
2000s American animated films
2000s English-language films
Films set in bunkers